Edgar Heilbronner  (13 May 1921 – 28 August 2006) was a Swiss German chemist. In 1964 he published the concept of Möbius cyclic annulenes,  but the first Möbius aromatic was not synthesized until 2003.

Edgar Heilbronner was a professor at the ETH Zürich, Switzerland for many years but then was offered a professorship in Basel, Switzerland
where he spent the remainder of his career.

References

1921 births
2006 deaths
20th-century Swiss chemists
20th-century German chemists
Academic staff of ETH Zurich